The 2009 UEFA Super Cup was the 34th UEFA Super Cup, an annual football match between the winners of the previous season's UEFA Champions League and UEFA Cup competitions. The match was contested by 2008–09 UEFA Champions League winners, Barcelona, and 2008–09 UEFA Cup winners, Shakhtar Donetsk at the Stade Louis II in Monaco on 28 August 2009, following the UEFA Champions League and Europa League draws at the Grimaldi Forum.

This was the first meeting between the two sides since they met in Group C of the previous season's Champions League competition.

Venue
The Stade Louis II in Monaco has been the venue for the UEFA Super Cup every year since 1998. Built in 1985, the stadium is also the home of AS Monaco, who play in the French league system.

Teams

Match

Details

Statistics

See also
FC Barcelona in international football competitions
FC Shakhtar Donetsk in European football

References

External links
UEFA Super Cup History: 2009, UEFA.com

Super
2009 in Monégasque sport
2009
Super Cup Uefa 2009
Super Cup 2009
UEFA Cup
Super
Super Cup 2009
August 2009 sports events in Europe